The 2007 ASA Kwik-Trip Midwest Tour presented by Echo Outdoor Power Equipment was the first season of the American Speed Association's Midwest Tour.  The championship was held over 11 races, beginning April 28 in Elko, Minnesota, and ending October 7 in West Salem, Wisconsin.  Nathan Haseleu was the champion.

Schedule and results

Championship points

References

Asa Midwest Tour
ASA Midwest Tour seasons